British Airways Flight 2276 was a scheduled international passenger service from Las Vegas to London. On 8 September 2015, the Boeing 777-200ER operating the flight suffered an uncontained engine failure and fire in the left (#1) GE90 engine during take-off from Las Vegas-McCarran International Airport, prompting an aborted take-off and the evacuation of all passengers and crew. All 170 people on board survived, but 20 were injured.

The aircraft, which suffered moderate damage to a section of its forward fuselage as of a result of the vigorous fire, was repaired and returned to commercial passenger service in March 2016. The fire was caused by metal fatigue in a compressor disk, leading to detachment of the main fuel supply line.

Incident 

The aircraft left Terminal 3, Gate E3, at 15:53 local time, and began its take-off from Runway 07L at 16:12 where the incident occurred.

After noticing what the pilot later described as a "catastrophic failure of the engine" well before take-off speed, the flight crew aborted the take-off by using the aircraft's brakes and ordered an evacuation of the aircraft. All 170 passengers and crew escaped. Nineteen people sustained minor injuries and one person sustained serious injuries. The aircraft is thought to have reached a speed of approximately  when the decision to abort was made; far below the takeoff decision speed of the aircraft, which would have been at least .

The airport's emergency services extinguished the fire within five minutes of the mayday call.  Fourteen people were lightly injured, mostly from sliding down the escape chutes, and treated at Sunrise Hospital & Medical Center. The fire caused a large hole in the cargo hold and damage to the engine.

The Federal Aviation Administration (FAA) indicated the fire was caused by failure of the left General Electric GE90 engine, one of two fitted on the aircraft. The aircraft came to a halt upwind, causing the fire to be blown towards the fuselage; the aircraft sustained localised, but major, structural damage as a result. The aircraft was equipped with suppression systems, though the systems did not extinguish the fire.

The runway, one of four, was closed, and several inbound flights were cancelled.

Aircraft and crew 

The aircraft involved in the incident was a Boeing 777-236ER, s/n 29320, registered as G-VIIO.  At the time of the incident, the aircraft was 16 years old; it had been delivered new to British Airways on 26 January 1999. 

The captain was 63-year-old Chris Henkey, who had been with British Airways since 1973 and received his type rating on the Boeing 777 in 1999. He had 30,000 flight hours, including 12,000 hours on the Boeing 777. Flight 2276 was intended to be his penultimate flight before his retirement (which was intended to occur in a week), but following the accident he decided that Flight 2276 would be his final flight.

The first officer, 30-year-old Ian Callaghan, joined the airline in 2006, receiving his type rating on the Boeing 777 in 2011, and had 6,400 flight hours, with 3,100 hours on the Boeing 777. 45-year-old relief pilot Kevin Hillyer was also on board. He had been with British Airways since 1997 and had been type rated on the Boeing 777 since 2001. The relief pilot had 14,000 flight hours, and like captain Henkey, was also well experienced on the Boeing 777 having logged 10,000 hours on it. He was a first officer at the time of the accident.

Repair 
In December 2015, British Airways announced that a team of engineers from Boeing had assessed the aircraft and determined the damage was limited and suitable for repair. As a result, it was announced that the aircraft would be repaired and returned to service. A team from Boeing completed the repairs in February 2016.

Airworthiness tests were conducted on the aircraft on 25 February 2016. On 26 February, the aircraft made its departure from Las Vegas McCarran airport at 1:33 p.m. and was flown to Victorville, arriving at 3:06 p.m, where it was repainted and further repairs and maintenance work was performed. The aircraft was then flown to British Airways Maintenance Cardiff in Cardiff on 15 March for a routine C check. Finally, it returned to its London Gatwick base and resumed passenger service on 24 March.

Investigation 

The National Transportation Safety Board (NTSB), the American air accident investigative body, dispatched four investigators to the site the day after the incident. As well as FAA, Boeing and General Electric involvement, the British Air Accidents Investigation Branch has a representative and that representative has appointed "British Airways and the UK Civil Aviation Authority as technical advisors". Initial NTSB findings were that an uncontained engine failure had occurred and that the "left engine and pylon, left fuselage structure and inboard left wing airplane were substantially damaged by the fire". On 6 October 2015, the NTSB issued an update stating that the accident was traced to the failure of the "stage 8–10 spool in the high-pressure compressor section...liberating fragments that breached the engine case and cowling".
The NTSB released their final report 2 years and 10 months later. The cause of the accident was determined as:

See also 
 American Airlines Flight 383 (2016) - A Boeing 767-300 which caught fire at O'Hare Airport.
 Korean Air Flight 2708 – Another Boeing 777 that experienced an engine fire at Haneda Airport.
 BOAC Flight 712
 British Airtours Flight 28M
 TWA Flight 843
 Saudia Flight 163
United Airlines Flight 328 and United Airlines Flight 1175, other Boeing 777s that suffered uncontained engine failures.
 Tibet Airlines Flight 9833

Notes

References

External links 

Cockpit Voice Recorder transcript and accident summary
NTSB investigation docket

Aviation accidents and incidents in 2015
Aviation accidents and incidents in Nevada
2015 in Nevada
Harry Reid International Airport
Accidents and incidents involving the Boeing 777
2276
September 2015 events in the United States
Airliner accidents and incidents involving uncontained engine failure